Sawmill Mountain is located on the county line between Kern and Ventura counties in California. The mountain is located in the Chumash Wilderness and its summit is the highest point in Kern County and the second highest in the Los Padres National Forest.

References

External links 
 
 

Mountains of Kern County, California
Mountains of Ventura County, California
Mountains of Southern California